A total lunar eclipse will take place on Thursday, December 20, 2029.

Visibility

Related lunar eclipses

Lunar year series

Metonic series (19 years)

Half-Saros cycle
A lunar eclipse will be preceded and followed by solar eclipses by 9 years and 5.5 days (a half saros). This lunar eclipse is related to two total solar eclipses of Solar Saros 142.

See also
List of lunar eclipses and List of 21st-century lunar eclipses

Notes

External links

2029-12
2029-12
2029 in science